Brett Michael Rumford (born 27 July 1977) is an Australian professional golfer who plays on the European Tour, having formerly been a member on both the PGA Tour and PGA Tour of Australasia.

Early life
Rumford was born and grew up in Perth, Western Australia. He started playing golf at age ten. Rumford represented Australia in amateur golf.

Professional career
In 1999, Rumford won the PGA Tour of Australasia's ANZ Players Championship as an amateur, and he turned professional the following year. He has been a member of the European Tour since 2001, and has won six European Tour events, the 2003 Aa St Omer Open, the 2004 Irish Open, the 2007 Omega European Masters, the 2013 Ballantine's Championship, the 2013 Volvo China Open, and the 2017 ISPS Handa World Super 6 Perth. His best year-end ranking on the Order of Merit Is 17th in 2013.

Rumford played on the PGA Tour in 2008, after earning his card through qualifying school, finishing the season ranked 149th in the FedEx Cup standings. He returned to play on the European Tour in 2009.

In April 2013, Rumford won for the fourth time on the European Tour and for the first time in six years at the Ballantine's Championship in South Korea. In a sudden-death playoff, Rumford eagled the first extra hole to defeat Marcus Fraser and Peter Whiteford. In the playoff, after both opponents had failed to reach the par-five 18th in two, Rumford fired his approach to within four feet of the hole to set up the eagle and seal victory. The following week he continued his good form winning the Volvo China Open, his fifth on the European Tour, his score of −16 giving him a four stroke winning margin over Mikko Ilonen. With this win he became the 31st golfer to win consecutive events on the European Tour and the first since Branden Grace in January 2012 and moved to the top of the Race to Dubai standings.

In February 2017, Rumford won the ISPS Handa World Super 6 Perth. He beat Phachara Khongwatmai, 2 and 1, in the final.

Amateur wins
1998 Australian Amateur, Lake Macquarie Amateur

Professional wins (9)

European Tour wins (6)

1Dual-ranking event with the Challenge Tour
2Co-sanctioned by the Asian Tour
3Co-sanctioned by the Korean Tour
4Co-sanctioned by the OneAsia Tour
5Co-sanctioned by the PGA Tour of Australasia

European Tour playoff record (2–0)

Asian Tour wins (2)

1Co-sanctioned by the European Tour
2Co-sanctioned by the Korean Tour
3Co-sanctioned by the PGA Tour of Australasia

Asian Tour playoff record (1–0)

PGA Tour of Australasia wins (3)

1Co-sanctioned by the European Tour and the Asian Tour

PGA Tour of Australasia playoff record (1–0)

Challenge Tour wins (1)

1Dual-ranking event with the European Tour

Other wins (1)
2005 Western Australian Open

Results in major championships

CUT = missed the half-way cut
"T" = tied

Results in World Golf Championships
Results not in chronological order before 2015.

"T" = tied
Note that the HSBC Champions did not become a WGC event until 2009.

Team appearances
Amateur
Nomura Cup (representing Australia): 1997, 1999 (winners)
Eisenhower Trophy (representing Australia): 1998
Bonallack Trophy (representing Asia/Pacific): 1998

See also
2007 PGA Tour Qualifying School graduates

References

External links

Brett Rumford player profile, Golf Australia

Australian male golfers
PGA Tour of Australasia golfers
European Tour golfers
PGA Tour golfers
Golfers from Perth, Western Australia
1977 births
Living people